Murgoci is a Romanian surname. Notable people with the surname include:

Agnes Murgoci (1875–1929), English zoologist and folklorist
Gheorghe Munteanu Murgoci (1872–1925), Romanian geologist
Elena Murgoci (1960–1999), Romanian marathon runner

Romanian-language surnames